Roads of Strategic Importance (ROSI) is a $5.8 billion initiative of the Australian Government designed to help connect regional businesses to local and international markets, and to better connect regional communities. The source for this article is an Australian Government website titled "Roads of Strategic Importance". Funding by the Australian Government is up to 80% of total costs, with the remainder being met by state, territory and local governments. ROSI reserves $1.5 billion for projects in Northern Australia, building on the benefits being delivered by the Northern Australia Roads Program and the Northern Australia Beef Roads Program.

Types of work
ROSI is ensuring that key freight roads efficiently connect agricultural and mining regions to ports, airports and other transport hubs. The work undertaken includes bridge and culvert construction, road widening, sealing, overtaking lanes and pavement renewal.

Strategic corridors
Most ROSI projects are grouped within defined corridors, which are listed separately in alphabetic sequence for each of Northern and Southern Australia. A corridor includes roads and related infrastructure associated with the efficient operation of the principal highway or road in the corridor. Each corridor listed contains zero to many projects, some of which pertain to a single road  while others cover multiple roads and/or related infrastructure.

Northern Australia corridors
  to Northern Territory (NT) border (3 projects)
 Mid-west secondary freight network (1 project)
 NT gas industry roads upgrades (1 project)

Southern Australia corridors
 Barton Highway (1 project)
  to Robinvale (2 projects)
 Great Northern Highway –  bypass (1 project)
 Great southern secondary freight network
 Green triangle (2 projects)
  to South Australia (SA) border (1 project)
 Tasmanian roads package (15 projects)
 Wheatbelt secondary freight network (1 project)

Non-corridor initiatives
 New South Wales (11 projects)
 Queensland (16 projects)
 South Australia (1 project)
 Victoria (4 projects)
 Western Australia (1 project)

ROSI projects
For each corridor or project in the source document with a link indicator (underline) there is a linked Project Description web page or PDF document. The project description shows some or all of the following details:
 Benefits
 Funding
 Timetable
 Status

One named corridor has no associated projects, and several named projects have no linked Project Description. This article will be updated when further details become available.

Queensland projects
Refer to Roads of Strategic Importance in Queensland for a list of ROSI projects in Queensland. The document shows which projects have been copied to relevant Wikipedia articles. The project "Cairns to NT border corridor – Ootann Road Sealing", which is not identified in the source document for this article, has been copied to the relevant Wikipedia article.

Other States details copied to articles

For all states and territories except the Australian Capital Territory there are ROSI projects for one or more roads in each of one or more strategic corridors, plus a number of non-corridor projects for all but Tasmania, the ACT and the Northern Territory. Some of the subject roads have Wikipedia articles that should be updated with details of the relevant project/s. The approximate number of projects listed for each state or territory is as follows:

Parliamentary report
The Parliament of Australia has produced a report on transport infrastructure that includes extensive details of the Roads of Strategic Importance Initiative, among others.

See also
 Road transport in Australia

References

External links 
 Our North, Our Future: White Paper on Developing Northern Australia

Roads in Australia
Lists of roads in Australia